Tiananmen: The People Versus the Party is a PBS 2 hour Show Special about 1989 Tiananmen Square protests and massacre. It "uncovers the true story of the seven-week period that changed China forever".

About the show 

On June 4, 1989, a large and peaceful pro-democracy demonstration ended violently, leaving hundreds if not thousands dead, and laying the foundation for China's future.

The pro-democracy movement was "the world’s biggest, longest, and most famous pro-democracy demonstration".

Tiananmen: The People Versus the Party
Tiananmen tells the gripping narrative of a period of just seven weeks in which the whole future of China today was founded, where at various turning points the final outcome could have avoided the massive bloodshed. These turning points unfold over two hours in a story told with the drama and pace of a political thriller.

References

PBS original programming
2019 television specials
1989 Tiananmen Square protests and massacre